"All You Need Is Love" is a song by The Beatles. 

All You Need Is Love may also refer to:

Music
 All You Need Is Love (Die Apokalyptischen Reiter album)
 All You Need Is Love (Nat Sakdatorn EP)
 "All You Need Is Love" (the JAMs song)
 "All You Need Is Love", a song by Avicii from his 2013 album True
 "All You Need Is Love", a theme song from the anime Magic Knight Rayearth
 "ALL YOU NEED IS LOVE", a track from the 2015 album Fake Metal Jacket by idol group BiSH

Film and television
 All You Need Is Love: The Story of Popular Music, a 1976-1980 television documentary series
 All You Need Is Love – Meine Schwiegertochter ist ein Mann, a 2009 German Television Film
 All You Need Is Love (film), a 2015 film

See also
 All You Need Is Luv', an album by Luv'
 Love Is All You Need (disambiguation)